James Pipes (November 10, 1840 – December 1, 1928) was an American soldier who fought with the Union Army in the American Civil War. Pipes received his country's highest award for bravery during combat, the Medal of Honor, for actions taken on July 2, 1863 during the Battle of Gettysburg.

Civil War service
On August 18, 1862, Pipes enlisted with a volunteer unit from Greene County that would become part of the 140th Pennsylvania Infantry. This unit was created by five men in western Pennsylvania, among them James J. Purman who would go on to win the Medal of Honor alongside Pipes. When the 140th was mustered, Pipes was ranked a sergeant, and Purman a second lieutenant.

In 1863, the 140th Pennsylvania Infantry fought in the Battle of Gettysburg. On the first day of battle, July 1, Pipes and Purman were on a path of retreat when they doubled back to help save a wounded soldier. After getting the soldier to safety, both men were shot in the legs. Pipes was captured by the Confederates, but was liberated by Union troops the next morning. After spending some time in a Philadelphia hospital, Pipes was promoted to the rank of Lieutenant. He returned to the field in November.

After Gettysburg, Pipes served in the Siege of Petersburg where he was promoted to captain in June 1864. On August 24, Pipes was commanding a group of soldiers guarding a section of enemy train tracks and was attacked by enemy troops. As he commanded his troops' retreat, his right arm was shot and had to be amputated that night. He was hospitalized through November, and was discharged for disability in February 1865.

Medal of Honor citation

Personal life
After the war, Pipes moved to Wheeling, West Virginia, where his family had relocated to during the war. In December 1869 he received an artificial arm. The following year he married Martha Rowena Purdy and had five children by her.

Pipes died of pneumonia in 1928 and was buried in Arlington National Cemetery.

References

External links
Arlington National Cemetery

1840 births
1928 deaths
American Civil War recipients of the Medal of Honor
People from Greene County, Pennsylvania
People of Pennsylvania in the American Civil War
Burials at Arlington National Cemetery
United States Army Medal of Honor recipients